Páez (also Paez, Paes; or the autonym Nasa Yuwe 'Nasa language') is a language of Colombia, spoken by the Páez people. Crevels (2011) estimates 60,000 speakers out of an ethnic population of 140,000.

The language is spoken by the second largest Colombian indigenous community, the Páez, in the north of the Cauca Department, in southwestern Colombia. However, the people had to move to other departments of Colombia like Huila, Tolima and Valle del Cauca.

Classification

Páez is generally considered to be a language isolate, or at least the only surviving member of its family (Adelaar & Muysken 2004).

Language contact
Jolkesky (2016) notes that there are lexical similarities with the Chibcha, Barbakoa, Choko, Tukano, Andaki, and Kofan language families due to contact.

Varieties
Below is a full list of Paezan language varieties listed by Loukotka (1968), including names of unattested varieties.

Paez / Paisa – the language spoken in the villages of the Paez River, the department of Huila. Dialects include:
Nasayuwä – spoken in the village of Pitayo.
Okoshkokyéwa – spoken in the village of La Peña.
Paniquita – spoken in some villages, Paniquita, and others, in the Huila region.

Panzaleo / Latacunga / Quito – an extinct language once spoken in the provinces of Pichincha, Cotopaxi, and Tungurahua, Ecuador.
Alausí – once spoken in the village of Alausí, Chimborazo province, Ecuador. (Unattested.)

History
Although dozens of indigenous languages have been extinguished at the hand of the Spanish (and later Colombian) Empire, there remain more than 60 languages within the boundaries of what is now known as Colombia. Most of these languages are classified into 10 linguistic families: Chibcha, Arawak, Carib, Quechua, Tukano, Guahibo, Makú-Puinave, Bora-Witoto, Piaroa-Sáliba, and Chocó. During the 1900s, initial research suggested that Nasa Yuwe was part of the Chibcha language family, which includes Arwako, Kogi, Wiwa, Tunebo, Motilone, Chimila, and Cuna. However, Nasa Yuwe is now considered to constitute a small language family of its own—the Paezan languages. Today, many Misak live in some primarily Nasa settlements creating a situation of language contact and in some cases bilingualism.

Agriculture is the basis of the Nasa economy and as such, they have been fighting to maintain their current land holdings and expand into their traditional lands. The language has been threatened by colonial policies for centuries, however recent positive attitudes toward the language have begun to reverse the tide of language extinction. The first threat to the language came in the 1600s with the introduction of compulsory Spanish language education in Colombia.

The education system was designed to suppress Nasa Yuwe. The Colombian empire pushed assimilatory policies that forced citizenship upon indigenous people and forced schooling on them to 'civilize' them. Children who spoke in their native language were punished, in some cases by being forced to kneel on grains of corn for hours. Thus, people were forced to avoid their languages.

Revitalization
With the General Law of Education, ethnoeducation is the opportunity of education for ethnic groups, but education needs to be related to the culture, traditions, language, and native elements of ethnic groups. To achieve the goal to give importance to indigenous languages, it is important to ensure that future indigenous generations preserve and relearn languages that do not have social privilege in Colombian society. Thus, it was necessary to implement booklets and original content material in different languages.

Although the government proposed the introduction of education of native languages in some communities, the preservation of languages and identities has been neglected. It is important to revitalize the language because it is part of the identity of many people who have been not considered part of Colombian society.

The first step is for the native teachers to know all the academic aspects and the sociocultural aspects of the ethnic group. The next is the creation of a campaign to promote the importance of the language in a minority community to maintain identity. The goal of the campaign is to reinforce the use of the language in the education environment and the family environment because they are children's first and most influential contacts. The last step is to promote the project to being used with other endangered languages of our country and revitalize them. it is also necessary to create a conscience in the rest of society to avoid the marginalization of the people who speak these native languages.

Phonology 
Paez has four oral vowel phonemes: /i, e, a, u/. Each oral vowel phoneme has a corresponding nasal /ĩ ẽ ã ũ/, aspirated /iʰ eʰ aʰ uʰ/, and long-form /iː eː aː uː/, all of which are contrastive. Also, each vowel sound can be laryngealized /ḭ ḛ a̰ ṵ/. Laryngealization can occur on nasalized or plain vowels, but not long vowels, while nasalization can occur to a plain or lengthened vowel. Vowel length is not contrastive in all dialects.

Vocabulary
Loukotka (1968) lists the following basic vocabulary items for Paez, Nasayuwä, Okoshkokyéwa, Paniquita, and Panzaleo.

{| class="wikitable sortable"
! gloss !! Paez !! Nasayuwä !! Okoshkokyéwa !! Paniquita !! Panzaleo
|-
! one
| yas || tech || tesha || tesha || 
|-
! two
| ents || ents || hänts || hentsa || 
|-
! three
| kek || tek || tek || texta || 
|-
! ear
| tún-gua || tõ-ué || tõ-ua || tu-gue || 
|-
! tongue
| tone || tönä || téne || tuné || 
|-
! hand
| kosä || kúsä || kosa || konsé || 
|-
! foot
| chinda || chinda || chinda || chinda || 
|-
! water
| yó || yu || yo || yohua || 
|-
! stone
| kuéth || uét || kwat || kuet || 
|-
! maize
| kukx || kutx || kutx || kokavi || 
|-
! fish
| enzte || wench || winx || wenche || pila
|-
! house
| yath || yat || yet || yat || an
|}

References

Bibliography
 Adelaar, Willem F. H.; & Muysken, Pieter C. (2004). The languages of the Andes. Cambridge language surveys. Cambridge University Press.
 Brend, Ruth M. (Ed.). (1985). From phonology to discourse: Studies in six Colombian languages (p. vi, 133). Language Data, Amerindian Series (No. 9). Dallas: Summer Institute of Linguistics.
 Castillo y Orozco (del), Eugenio. (1877) Vocabulario Paez–Castellano. Ezequiel Uricoechea ed. Maisonneuve y Cia. Libreros Editores, París.
 Fabre, Alain. (2005). Nasa Yuwe / Páez. Diccionario etnolingüístico y guía bibliográfica de los pueblos indígenas sudamericanos. (To appear)..
 Gerdel, Florence L. and others. (1973). Sistemas fonológicos de idiomas colombianos 2. Bogotá: Ministerio de Gobierno and Instituto Lingüístico de Verano. 132 p.
 Gerdel, Florence L. (1979). Paez. In Aspectos de la cultura material de grupos étnicos de Colombia 2, (pp. 181–202). Bogota: Ministerio de Gobierno and Instituto Lingüístico de Verano.
 Gerdel, Florence L. and Marianna C. Slocum. (1976). Páez discourse, paragraph and sentence structure." In Robert E. Longacre and Frances Woods (eds.), Discourse grammar: Studies in indigenous languages of Colombia, Panama, and Ecuador, 1: 259–443. Summer Institute of Linguistics Publications in Linguistics and Related Fields, 52(1). Dallas: SIL and the University of Texas at Arlington.
 Nieves Oviedo, Rocío; Tulio Rojas y Marcos Yule. (1991): Estudios Fonológicos de la Lengua Paez (Nasa Yuwe); Descripciones 6; Colciencias – Universidad de los Andes, Bogotá.
 Rojas Curieux, Tulio; Roció Nieves Oviedo, y Marcos Yule Yatacue. (1991): Estudios Grammaticales de la Lengua Paez (Nasa Yuwe). Descripciones 7; Colciencias – Universidad de los Andes, Bogotá.
 Slocum, Marianna C. (1986). Gramática páez. Lomalinda: Editorial Townsend.
 Slocum, Marianna C. (1972). ¿Cómo se dice en páez?. Lomalinda: Ministerio de Gobierno.
 Slocum, Marianna C. and Florence L. Gerdel. (1983). Diccionario: páez-español / español-páez. Lomalinda: Editorial Townsend.

External links

 Proel: Lengua Paes
 Fabre: Nasa
 Páez (Intercontinental Dictionary Series)

Languages of Colombia
Macro-Paesan languages
Language isolates of South America
Indigenous languages of the South American Northwest
Endangered indigenous languages of the Americas
Endangered language isolates